Deh Now (also Romanized as Deh-e Now and Deh-i-Nau) is a village in Hoseynabad-e Goruh Rural District, Rayen District, Kerman County, Kerman Province, Iran. At the 2006 census, its population was 13, in 4 families.

References 

Populated places in Kerman County